William Gore 921 January 1779 - 6 January 1831) was a Church of Ireland priest.

Gore was born at Manorhamilton and educated at Trinity College Dublin. Gore was the incumbent at Templederry from 1703 to 1715. He was Archdeacon of Clogher from 1716 to 1718; Dean of Clogher from 1718 until 1724. and Dean of Down from 1724 until his death.

Notes

Archdeacons of Clogher
Deans of Clogher
Deans of Down
18th-century Irish Anglican priests
1731 deaths
Alumni of Trinity College Dublin
People from County Leitrim